Theognis is the name of:

 Theognis of Megara, 6th century BC Greek elegiac poet
Theognis (tyrant), one of the Thirty Tyrants of Athens in 404–403 BC (possibly to be identified with the minor tragic poet mentioned by Aristophanes)
 Theognis of Nicaea, 4th century AD bishop